Sadigachhi is a census town in the Hasnabad CD block in the  Basirhat subdivision of the North 24 Parganas district in the state of West Bengal, India.

Geography

Location                                                       

Area overview
The area shown in the map is a part of the Ichhamati-Raimangal Plain, located in the lower Ganges Delta. It contains soil of mature black or brownish loam to recent alluvium. Numerous rivers, creeks and khals criss-cross the area. The tip of the Sundarbans National Park is visible in the lower part of the map (shown in green but not marked). The larger full screen map shows the full forest area. A large section of the area is a part of the Sundarbans settlements. The densely populated area is an overwhelmingly rural area. Only 12.96% of the population lives in the urban areas and 87.04% of the population lives in the rural areas.

Note: The map alongside presents some of the notable locations in the subdivision. All places marked in the map are linked in the larger full screen map.

Demographics
According to the 2011 Census of India, Sadigachhi had a total population of 6,248, of which 3,224 (52%) were males and 3,024 (48%) were females. Population in the age range 0-6 years was 615. The total number of literate persons in  Sadigachhi was 4,484 (79.60% of the population over 6 years).

Infrastructure
According to the District Census Handbook, North Twenty Four Parganas,  2011, Sadigachhi covered an area of 2.1692 km2. The protected water-supply involved tap water from treated sources, hand pumps. It had 576 domestic electric connections. Among the medical facilities it had 1 hospital and 6 medicine shops. Among the educational facilities, it had 3 primary schools, 3 middle schools, 2 secondary schools, 2 senior secondary schools. The nearest college was 15 km away at Taki.

References

Cities and towns in North 24 Parganas district